Fergana is a city in eastern Uzbekistan, capital of Fergana Province.

Fergana may also refer to:
Geography
 Fergana Airport, an airport in eastern Uzbekistan, serving the city of Fergana 
 Fergana Region, a viloyat of Uzbekistan, located in the southern part of the Fergana Valley
 Fergana Range, a mountain range in Tian Shan in the Kyrgyz Republic.
 Fergana Valley, a region in Central Asia spreading across eastern Uzbekistan, Kyrgyzstan and Tajikistan
 Great Fergana Canal, an artificial canal covering 270 km in the Fergana Valley 
History
 Kingdom of Fergana, a former state in Central Asia 
 Fergana massacre
Linguistics
 Fergana Kipchak language, an old Turkic language from Central Asia 
Sports
 Fergana Challenger, a professional tennis tournament 
Zoology
 Fergana horse, an extinct horse breed from Central Asia
 Fergana (moth), an insect from the family Noctuidae